This article lists important figures and events in the public affairs of British Malaya during the year 1932, together with births and deaths of prominent Malayans.

Incumbent political figures

Central level 
 Governor of Federated of Malay States :
 Cecil Clementi
 Chief Secretaries to the Government of the FMS :
 Charles Walter Hamilton Cochrane (until unknown date)
 Andrew Caldecott (from unknown date)
 Governor of Straits Settlements :
 Cecil Clementi

State level 
  Perlis :
 Raja of Perlis : Syed Alwi Syed Saffi Jamalullail
  Johore :
 Sultan of Johor : Sultan Ibrahim Al-Masyhur
  Kedah :
 Sultan of Kedah : Abdul Hamid Halim Shah
  Kelantan :
 Sultan of Kelantan : Sultan Ismail Sultan Muhammad IV
  Trengganu :
 Sultan of Trengganu : Sulaiman Badrul Alam Shah
  Selangor :
 British Residents of Selangor : G. E. Cater 
 Sultan of Selangor : Sultan Sir Alaeddin Sulaiman Shah
  Penang :
 Monarchs : King George V
 Residents-Councillors : Percy Tothill Allen 
  Malacca :
 Monarchs : King George V
 Residents-Councillors :
  Negri Sembilan :
 British Residents of Negri Sembilan : 
 James William Simmons (until unknown date)
 John Whitehouse Ward Hughes (from unknown date)
 Yang di-Pertuan Besar of Negri Sembilan : Tuanku Muhammad Shah ibni Almarhum Tuanku Antah 
   Pahang :
 British Residents of Pahang : Hugh Goodwin Russell Leonard
 Sultan of Pahang :
 Sultan Abdullah al-Mu'tassim Billah (until unknown date)
 Sultan Abu Bakar (from unknown date)
  Perak :
 British Residents of Perak : 
 Bertram Walter Elles (until unknown date)
 G. E. Cater (from unknown date)
 Sultan of Perak : Sultan Iskandar Shah

Events 
 23 November  – Royal Malay Regiment was formed.
 Unknown date – Ho Hong Bank, OCB Bank and CCB Bank merged to form OCBC Bank.

Births 
 2 February – Maria Menado – Actress
 21 March – Wan Mokhtar Ahmad – Politician (died 2020)
 8 April – Sultan Iskandar ibni Sultan Ismail – 4th modern Sultan of Johor (died 2010)
 30 May – Abdul Ghani Gilong – Politician (died 2021)
 7 November – Tuanku Siti Bainun binti Mohd Ali – 34th Raja Permaisuri of Perak
 Unknown date – Ahmad C – Actor (died 2010)
 Unknown date – Ahmad Daud – Actor (died 2002)
 Unknown date – Ani Arope – Corporate figure (died 2014)
 Unknown date – Ibrahim Pendek – Actor (died 2003)
 Unknown date – Ismail Hussein – Academician
 Unknown date – Kasma Booty – Actress (died 2007)
 Unknown date – Nordin Ahmad – Actor (died 1971)
 Unknown date – Normadiah – Actress (died 2000)
 Unknown date – Osman Zailani – Actor (died 2017)
 Unknown date – Raja Hamidah Raja Saat – Actress (died 2012)
 Unknown date – Rozhan Kuntom – Corporate figure (died 2014)
 Unknown date – Tengku Ahmad Rithauddeen Ismail – Politician
 Unknown date – Zainal Abidin Safarwan – Academician

Deaths 
 Sultan Abdullah al Mutasim Billah Shah – 3rd modern Sultan of Pahang

See also 
 1932
 1931 in Malaya
 1933 in Malaya
 History of Malaysia

References 

1930s in British Malaya
Malaya